is a Japanese professional baseball player. He was born on January 2, 1985. He debuted in 2012 for the Hokkaido Nippon-Ham Fighters. He had 37 strikeouts that year.

References

Living people
1985 births
People from Aomori (city)
Baseball people from Aomori Prefecture
Japanese baseball players
Nippon Professional Baseball pitchers
Hokkaido Nippon-Ham Fighters players
Aomori University alumni